Carla Boyd (born 31 October 1975) is an Australian former professional basketball player in the WNBA as a forward for the Detroit Shock. She won a bronze (1996) and a silver (2000) medal with the Australian Women's Team at the Summer Olympics.

International career
She played in Tarbes (France) in 2001-2002 and 2002–2003, taking part in the French League (LFB) and in the EuroLeague for Women.

Club career

Australia
 1991–1993: Australian Institute of Sport (WNBL)
 1994–1998; 2000–2001: Adelaide Lightning (WNBL)

WNBA
 1998–1999; 2001: Detroit Shock

Europe
 1998–1999: GoldZack Wuppertal
 2001–2005: Tarbes GB

See also
 List of Australian WNBA players

References

1975 births
Living people
Australian women's basketball players
Australian expatriate basketball people in Germany
Australian expatriate basketball people in the United States
Australian expatriate basketball people in France
Shooting guards
Detroit Shock players
Adelaide Lightning players
Basketball players at the 1996 Summer Olympics
Basketball players at the 2000 Summer Olympics
Sportswomen from Tasmania
Olympic basketball players of Australia
Olympic bronze medalists for Australia
Olympic silver medalists for Australia
Tarbes Gespe Bigorre players
Olympic medalists in basketball
People from Wynyard, Tasmania
Australian Institute of Sport basketball (WNBL) players
Medalists at the 2000 Summer Olympics
Medalists at the 1996 Summer Olympics